KMB or kmb may refer to:
KMB Jazz, a record label
Khushhali Microfinance Bank, Pakistan
Kimberly-Clark Corporation, NYSE symbol
Kowloon Motor Bus, Hong Kong
Kimbundu, an Angolan language, based on its ISO 639-3 code.